A Hardy is any one of a category of mountain, hill or high point in the United Kingdom, the Channel Islands and Isle of Man which is the highest point in either a hill range, an island over , or a top-tier administrative area.

Hill list
The Hardy hill list was compiled by Ian Hardy in the early 1990s, published in two booklet editions in the later 1990s, and updated in a third edition in 2010 in a much-expanded book format, The Hardys - The UK's High Points.

The Hardy publication is listed by the Long Distance Walkers Association (LDWA) as an acceptable source for completions of the County Tops of England and Wales, and has featured in its magazine Strider.  It also features in a 'list of lists' on the Ordnance Survey blog.

The hill list has also featured in Country Walking and The Great Outdoors magazines.

Number and location
There are now 347 Hardys identified in the United Kingdom, Channel Islands and Isle of Man (with the recent addition (to July 2016) of 5 English low-lying coastal estuary islands): the high points of 61 hill ranges, 96 islands and 190 administrative areas (where the high point is not a hill range or island).  There are 183 in England, 31 in Wales, 107 in Scotland and 26 in Northern Ireland.

Within the Hardy list, there are 135 "Core" Hardys, the compiler's original list before a formal lower size limit for islands was established and before the large-scale administrative area changes from the mid-1990s onwards.  The highest Hardy is Ben Nevis in Scotland at 1,344 metres, the United Kingdom's highest point, and the lowest location identified is on Hayling Island in Hampshire at only 10 metres.  The 5 recent additional Hardys are Portsea Island (343), Foulness (344), Canvey Island (345), Thorney Island (346) and Potton Island (347), all in the South-east of England.

Many Hardys feature in other major hill lists (for example, there are 10 Munros, 23 Hewitts and 127 Marilyns) but the Hardy list is unique in identifying high points in the three separate categories of hill ranges, islands and administrative areas.  This means there are Hardys all over the United Kingdom, not just in mountain and hill areas, so many Hardys are in lowland and even urban areas, and on small islands.  Thus at least one or more Hardys are accessible wherever a person lives in the United Kingdom, and irrespective of their level of fitness.

Hardys can be "bagged" in the same way as summits in other hill lists.

Hardys of England 
 Bassett Avenue
 Beacon Batch
 Black Hambleton
 Botton Head
 Brown Clee Hill
 Brown Willy
 Butser Hill
 The Cheviot
 Cleeve Hill, Gloucestershire
 Cross Fell
 Dunkery Hill
 Easton Hill
 Eggardon Hill
 Godlingston Hill
 High Willhays
 Kinder Scout
 Leith Hill
 Lewesdon Hill
 Liddington Hill
 Lype Hill
 Milk Hill
 Normanby Hill
 North Walney
 Pole Bank
 St Boniface Down
 Scafell Pike
 Staple Hill (Somerset)
 Walbury Hill
 Ward's Stone
 Wendover Hill
 Whernside
 Wills Neck
 Win Green
 Worcestershire Beacon

Hardys of Northern Ireland 
 Cuilcagh
 Divis
 Slieve Gullion
 Ouley Hill
 Sliabh Beagh
 Slieve Croob
 Slieve Donard
 Trostan

Hardys of Scotland 

 An Sgùrr (Eigg)
 Beinn an Òir
 Beinn Bheigeir
 Ben Cleuch
 Ben Macdui
 Ben Scrien
 Càrn a' Ghaill
 Carn Breugach
 Càrn Eige
 Craigowl Hill
 Creag Bhàn
 Goat Fell
 Green Lowther
 Heaval
 Meikle Says Law
 Merrick (Galloway)
 Middle Shalaval
 Scald Law

Hardys of Wales 

 Aran Fawddwy
 Cadair Berwyn
 Cadair Idris
 Carnedd Llewelyn
 Chwarel y Fan
 Craig Llysfaen
 Craig y Llyn
 Drygarn Fawr
 Fan Brycheiniog
 Fan Foel
 Foel Cwmcerwyn
 Garth Hill
 Holyhead Mountain
 Moel Famau
 Pen y Fan
 Plynlimon
 Snowdon
 Twyn Ffynhonnau Goerion
 Waun Fach
 Yr Arwydd

Crown Dependencies
 Le Moulin (Windmill), Sark
 Les Platons, Jersey
 Snaefell (Sniaull), Isle of Man

See also
Hill lists in the British Isles

References 

Geography of the United Kingdom
Mountains and hills of the United Kingdom